Oxford County Regional Airport  is a county-owned, public-use airport in Oxford County, Maine, United States. It is located two nautical miles (4 km) east of the central business district of Oxford, Maine. This airport is included in the National Plan of Integrated Airport Systems for 2011–2015, which categorized it as a general aviation facility.

Facilities and aircraft 
Oxford County Regional Airport covers an area of 70 acres (28 ha) at an elevation of 345 feet (105 m) above mean sea level. It has one runway designated 15/33 with an asphalt surface measuring 2,997 by 75 feet (913 x 23 m).

For the 12-month period ending August 13, 2007, the airport had 34,070 aircraft operations, an average of 93 per day: 99.8% general aviation and 0.2% air taxi. At that time there were 9 aircraft based at this airport: 89% single-engine and 11% multi-engine.

See also 
 List of airports in Maine

References

External links 
 Airport page at Oxford County website
 Oxford Aviation, the fixed-base operator (FBO)
 Aerial image as of May 1998 from USGS The National Map
 
 

Airports in Oxford County, Maine
Oxford, Maine